Miguel Hermoso (born 1942) is a Spanish film director and screenwriter. He has directed ten films since 1976. His 2003 film The End of a Mystery won the Golden St. George at the 25th Moscow International Film Festival.

Selected filmography
 Marbella (1985)
 Como un relámpago (1997)
 The End of a Mystery (2003)

References

External links

1942 births
Living people
Spanish film directors
Spanish male screenwriters
People from Granada